Waikolu Valley, also called Waikola, is on the North Shore of Molokai in Hawaii.  Access to this uninhabited valley is currently restricted as it is a partly within the Kalaupapa National Historical Park.

Hawaiians lived along the North Shore of Molokai including Waikolu Valley, cultivating taro and other food crops.  These isolated valleys were visited in the summer months when the weather is calmer; in winter, heavy surf renders the beaches inaccessible by outrigger canoe, the islanders' chief form of transportation.

The Native Hawaiian inhabitants were removed in 1865 and 1866 when the leper colony was established on the Kalaupapa Peninsula.  Waikolu Valley was where the first leprosy patients were off loaded in 1866.  However, the valley was soon abandoned, and the colony was established at Kalawao nearby.

Water system

Kalawao obtained its water supply from a spring in the Waikolu Valley, carried by pipe across the adjacent Waialeia Valley,  from the settlement. The spring was also the source of the water supply for Kalaupapa, on the dry side of the peninsula, where the leper colony moved in the early 20th century. In the late 1930s, the colony had expanded to the point that the limited water from Waikolu was no longer sufficient for the growing needs of the settlement. A water development project was undertaken to provide a sufficient supply of fresh water from Waikolu stream.

An intake system was installed at the  elevation,  up the valley, with a catchment system in the upper Waikolu Valley.  The water was piped in galvanized  pipe down to the shoreline where it ran on concrete posts along the base of the high cliffs separating Waikolu from Kalawao.  The pipeline had sufficient head to push the water up to Kalawao peninsula where the settlement was located.  The concrete monuments along the shoreline are the remnants of this early water delivery system.

This system was difficult to maintain especially in the winter months when the shoreline is pounded with winter swells and storms often would damage or clog the intake. Maintenance crews would hike up to a point near the intake and camp in a maintenance shack to do repairs to the system.  This system was replaced in 1982 with a well which gets water from an underground aquifer.

The modern water development from Waikolu Valley started with a federally funded project to divert water from Waikolu Stream to supply water to the dry western part of Molokai to help create jobs in construction and agriculture.

In the late 1960s, a contract was awarded to construct the Waikolu diversion and development tunnel which diverts water from Waikolu Stream into a  tunnel that delivers water above Kaunakakai town.  This water flows into the reservoir in Kualapuu and supplies domestic and agricultural water to Molokai farmers and residents.  Two-thirds of the water is for the Hawaiian Homes lands of Molokai and one-third of the water is for other agricultural users and domestic users on Molokai.

The project took 5 years to complete. You can see  through the tunnel.  It has a  elevation change to move the water through the tunnel. Cars can travel through the tunnel for maintenance work.

There are six springs that enter the tunnel from the side walls in the tunnel. When the well in the tunnel is turned on, it reduces the inflow from the springs and therefore it is rarely used.

Intake one was constructed to divert water from the main Waikolu Stream, and intake two from a side tributary both gravity feeding into the tunnel. The pumping is on demand. When there is sufficient water in the catchment area the pump automatically turns on until the level is at a designated level and then turns off. These pumps are run by electricity that is brought in through the tunnel. A series of 22 transformers are needed to get sufficient power to the pumps.

There are several environmental improvements including a fish ladder in the intake #1 and a water replacement pipe that allows some of the water from the lower elevation intake to flow back into the stream.

The tunnel is approximately  round with a concrete floor that slopes.

References

Landforms of Molokai
Valleys of Hawaii
Unincorporated communities in Kalawao County, Hawaii
Unincorporated communities in Maui County, Hawaii
Unincorporated communities in Hawaii
Former populated places in Hawaii
Populated places on Molokai